The 12505 / 12506 North East Express  is a daily Superfast train of Indian Railways, which runs between Kamakhya Junction (Guwahati, the largest city of Assam and the largest city of North Eastern region of India) and Anand Vihar near New Delhi (capital of India). It connects North Eastern India to New Delhi, hence the name. The train belongs to NF railway zone of Indian Railways (headquarters at Maligaon, Guwahati). The coaches of this train belongs to Kamakhya coaching depot of Lumding Division of NF Railway.

The North East Express succeeded the legendary Assam Mail in 1986. But halt pattern and timings of later introduced Sikkim Mahananda Express (first introduced between Delhi and Katihar) corresponds more to the Assam Mail's BG segment.

The train runs along the Barauni–Guwahati line, Mokama–Barauni section and Howrah–Delhi main line.

Service
The train is numbered as 12505/12506. Originally North East Express was not a Superfast and had service numbers 921 and 922 when introduced in 1986. In 1988, the train was assigned with new set of numbers as 2521 and 2522 which were later replaced with 5621 and 5622. It used to ply between Guwahati and New Delhi. In the Railway Budget 2005–06, it was sped up to the broad gauge Superfast category (broad gauge trains with 55 km/h or above average commercial speed) without withdrawing any previous intermediate stops. The new number assigned in the Superfast category were 2505 from Guwahati and 2506 from New Delhi. With the new five digit numbering scheme introduced during the tenure of Mamata Banerjee as Railway Minister, the service numbers are now 12505 and 12506. The train now starts from Kamakhya Junction railway station at Maligaon and run up to Anand Vihar Terminal instead of Guwahati & New Delhi.

Coaches
The train has AC as well as non-AC accommodation. The composition of the train is as follows – 2A – 1 (A-1), 3A – 3 (B-1, B-2, B-3), SL – 14 (S-1 to S-14), PC – 1, GENL – 3 & SLR – 2. The total rake length is 24 coaches. New LHB rakes are introduced on 03/03/2019.

Stoppage

Delhi to Guwahati
List of stops on the North East Express from Delhi to Guwahati.

Guwahati to Delhi
List of stops on the North East Express from Guwahati to Delhi.

Traction
It was hauled by a Siliguri-based WDP-4 / WDP-4B / WDP-4D locomotive from KYQ to NJP. From NJP to ANVT it was hauled by a Ghaziabad-based WAP-7 (HOG)-equipped locomotive and vice versa. From 22nd October 2021 this train is hauled by a Ghaziabad based WAP 7 electric locomotive end to end (KYQ-ANVT-KYQ) in both direction.

References 

Transport in Guwahati
Transport in Delhi
Express trains in India
Rail transport in Assam
Rail transport in West Bengal
Rail transport in Bihar
Rail transport in Uttar Pradesh
Rail transport in Delhi
Railway services introduced in 1986
Named passenger trains of India